Trapped ( Darband) is a 2013 Iranian moral thriller film written and directed by Parviz Shahbazi. The film stars Nazanin Bayati, Pegah Ahangarani, Behrang Alavi, Farid Samavati, Ahmad Mehranfar and Amir Samavati. The director won best director award in 13th Dhaka International Film Festival.

Critical reception 
There are no registered reviews at Rotten Tomatoes.

According to Alissa Simon in Variety, the movie is a "cautionary tale of universal resonance" that "spins a tension-filled drama about a naive but highly principled young woman from the provinces who comes to Tehran to study medicine, only to wind up in a legal nightmare due to her kind and trusting nature." It "benefits immensely from the smart and sensitive performances of an all-pro cast, particularly the two femme leads."

References

External links 

 Vancouver International Film Festival

2013 films
Iranian drama films
2010s Persian-language films
Films whose director won the Best Directing Crystal Simorgh